Kadarpiku is a village in Lääne-Nigula Parish, Lääne County, in western Estonia.

Painter Ants Laikmaa (1866–1942) lived in Kadarpiku village from 1932 to his death in 1942. The house is currently used as a museum dedicated to Laikmaa (Ants Laikmaa Museum).

References

Villages in Lääne County